Linn County Council may be:

Linn County Council (Iowa)
Linn County Council (Oregon)